Antonio Fernández del Campo Angulo y Velasco  (27 September 1619 – 23 December 1681) was a Roman Catholic prelate who served as Bishop of Jaén (1671–1681), Bishop of Coria (1669–1671), and Bishop of Tui (1666–1669).

Biography
Antonio Fernández del Campo Angulo y Velasco was born in Bilbao, Spain on 27 September 1619.
On 7 June 1666, he was appointed during the papacy of Pope Alexander VII as Bishop of Tui.
On 12 September 1666, he was consecrated bishop by Mateo de Sagade de Bugueyro, Bishop of Cartagena with Miguel Pérez Cevallos, Titular Bishop of Arcadiopolis in Asia, and Francisco Ocampo, Titular Bishop of Amyclae serving as co-consecrators.
On 3 June 1669, he was appointed during the papacy of Pope Clement IX as Bishop of Coria.
On 1 July 1671, he was appointed during the papacy of Pope Clement X as Bishop of Jaén.
He served as Bishop of Jaén until his death on 23 December 1681.
While bishop, he was the principal consecrator of Bernardino León de la Rocha, Bishop of Tui (1669); and the principal co-consecrator of Francisco Aguado, Bishop of Astorga (1677).

References

External links and additional sources
 (for Chronology of Bishops) 
 (for Chronology of Bishops) 
 (for Chronology of Bishops) 
 (for Chronology of Bishops) 
 (for Chronology of Bishops) 
 (for Chronology of Bishops) 

17th-century Roman Catholic bishops in Spain
Bishops appointed by Pope Alexander VII
Bishops appointed by Pope Clement IX
Bishops appointed by Pope Clement X
1619 births
1681 deaths